Vaishali Express is a daily Superfast train service, connecting Saharsa in Bihar to New Delhi. This train is one of the oldest train in this route.  Earlier it was known as Muzaffarpur–New Delhi Jayanti Jayanta Express.

It is the first train after Bhopal Express to be certified for quality at the ISO 9000 level. It connects the major cities of Bihar and Uttar Pradesh like Saharsa, Barauni, Samastipur, Muzaffarpur, Hajipur, Chhapra, Gorakhpur,  

Lucknow and Kanpur  with the national capital New Delhi.

This train is hauled by CNB (Kanpur)-based WAP-7 from end-to-end.(New Delhi–Saharsa)

History
It first ran between New Delhi and Muzaffarpur and was later extended to Barauni. It was later extended to Saharsa from 5 March 2019.

Coaches and facilities
This train has 4 dedicated rakes. It train runs with 22 LHB coach.

2 End on generators on both ends

1 AC First Class (H1)

1 AC First Class cum AC Two Tier (HA1)

1 AC Two Tier (A1)

3 AC Three Tier (B1 to B3)

9 Sleeper (S1 to S9)

3 Unreserved coaches

and a pantry car

Schedule

Gallery

Award 
Vaishali Express was awarded ISO 9000 on 1 May 2012.

References 

Transport in Delhi
Named passenger trains of India
Rail transport in Bihar
Express trains in India
Rail transport in Uttar Pradesh
Rail transport in Madhya Pradesh
Rail transport in Delhi
Railway services introduced in 1973